King of the Dudes may refer to:

Evander Berry Wall (1861–1940), a socialite dubbed "King of the Dudes"
King of the Dudes, an album by Sunflower Bean